Tanais (Russian: Танаис (кинотеатр)) is a cinema located in Novocherkassk, Rostov Region. The oldest cinema in the city. It is a monument of local architecture.

History 
In 1903 in Novocherkassk on Platovsky Avenue of Golokolosova in Kondratova's house was opened a cinema "Pathé". It was equipped with equipment brought from Paris by the French company "F. and E. Pathé ", in honor of it was originally called a cinema. Local Cossack Evdokiya Petrovna Kondratova organized the construction of the building specifically for the cinema. This building became the first in the city constructed especially as cinema in what its historical importance consists.

In the summer and autumn of 1914 the military theme was popular in the cinema. The following announcements were often met in the local press: in the electro-biographer Pathé there is a picture "Struggle against the demon" "with the participation of the famous kino-artist V. Harrison" or "Pathe" successfully competes in Novocherkassk, showing "great historical pictures like" Spartacus, the leader of the gladiators "and" Cleopatra and Antony ".

Initially, the building had a balcony. On the first floor on the left side was a haberdashery store, and on the right - a hairdresser. In the basement was a wine cellar. Throughout the twentieth century, the building was used for its immediate purpose. There were no more shops in it, only its name changed in 1927 the '"Pathé" cinema was renamed "Temp", then "III International", "Sovetskiy", "Komsomolets" and already in the 90's -" Tanais ".

In the 2000s, the building was under repair, and in early 2010 was put up for sale.

Links
Кинотеатр «Танаис»

References 

Tourist attractions in Rostov Oblast
Cinemas in Russia
Cultural heritage monuments in Novocherkassk
Buildings and structures in Novocherkassk
Cultural heritage monuments of regional significance in Rostov Oblast